The Lotus 907 is an inline-4 automobile engine designed and manufactured by Lotus Cars. Displacing , it is all-alloy, and features dual overhead camshafts (DOHC) and 16 valves. It was nicknamed "The Torqueless Wonder" for its lack of bottom end but good high end horsepower.

History
The Lotus 907 was the first production variant of the Lotus 900 series engine. The Jensen-Healey was the first production car to receive the 907.

It is said that when Vauxhall unveiled its new slant-four engine at the 1967 Earls Court Motor Show its bore centres were exactly the same as those proposed by Lotus. Colin Chapman immediately negotiated a deal with Vauxhall to buy some of their cast-iron blocks so that development of Lotus' own aluminium cylinder head could be sped up to produce the 907 engine.

Applications
The Type 75 Lotus Elite, Type 76 Lotus Eclat, and Type 79 Series 1 and early Series 2 Lotus Esprit, as well as the 1972-1976 Jensen-Healey were fitted with the 907 engine.

References

Lotus engines
Gasoline engines by model
Straight-four engines